WMI may refer to:

Organisations
 Washington Mutual Inc, a former savings bank holding company 
 Waste Management, Inc (former NYSE symbol), a provider of waste management services
 Water Missions International, an engineering organization providing safe water and sanitation following natural disasters
 West Michigan Railroad (reporting mark) 
 Wildlife Management Institute, of which Ira Noel Gabrielson was a former president
 World Medicine Institute, located in Honolulu, Hawaii, United States, offering degrees in acupuncture and oriental medicine

Other
 Windows Management Instrumentation, in Microsoft Windows operating systems, a set of extensions to the Windows Driver Model
 WMI (window manager), old name for wmii, the Window Manager Improved for the X Window System
 World manufacturer identifier, in a Vehicle Identification Number denoting the manufacturer of the vehicle and the region in which it was made
 Working Memory Index, part of the Wechsler Intelligence Scale for Children
 Warsaw Modlin Airport (IATA code), near Warsaw, Poland

fr:WMI